Maelstrom is a role-playing game by Alexander Scott, originally published in 1984 by Puffin Books as a single soft cover book. Maelstrom was published under Puffin's Adventure Gamebooks banner, along with the Fighting Fantasy series, The Cretan Chronicles trilogy, and the Starlight Adventures series. Maelstrom was written while Scott was a teenager in school. The game is set in a 16th to 17th century British setting – the Tudor Period and the Elizabethan era – although the rules can be adapted to other locations or time periods. Firearms (readily available in Europe at this time) are conspicuously absent from the setting, mentioned only in passing in the initial rulebook.

Maelstrom has been republished as a PDF in 2008 by Arion Games, under license from Puffin Books. Arion Games also published seven supplementary rulebooks and resources such as The Maelstrom Companion, the Beggars' Companion, and several modules and settings resources.  These are all available for online purchase at RPGNow.com in PDF format (see external links, below).  The Maelstrom Companion provides guidelines for the in-game purchase and use of period firearms, as well as new livings and other developments.

Combat

Wounds and healing 
Characters can easily end up with wounds that would last for months. They can suffer the permanent loss of digits, or limbs. Using the advanced rules a character may well collapse from particular types of mortal wounds, or in combat from sheer exhaustion, especially if wearing heavy armour. They could suffer cuts, bruises or a variety of serious injuries from their opponents' (or their own) weapons.

In Maelstrom, wounds are recorded separately and heal in parallel. Damage is rated on a numerical scale, a knife doing 1–6 damage for instance. When the sum of a character's wounds exceed his or her Endurance, that character falls unconscious.

Characters heal at the rate of 1 point per week assuming bed rest (and 1 point per month otherwise); this rate is per wound. A character suffering a series of minor wounds will recover much more quickly than one receiving a single significant wound. Treatments from a Doctor, Herbalist, or a Barber-Surgeon will increase the rate of healing – or possibly decrease it if a roll vs skill is critically failed.

Experience 

Experience rolls are on percentile dice and are made against a specific attribute when the character succeeds in an area relevant to that attribute.  When a successful experience roll is made the attribute increases by one point (indicating increased ability in this area).  Thus as characters become more experienced they have progressively more difficulty increasing attributes. As the author notes, it is less likely that an experienced character will learn a new trick too often, whereas someone who has no experience in a particular area may well learn something each time they exercise a skill.

Aging 

Age is a very important characteristic to a character in Maelstrom. All Maelstrom characters start at age 14.  As part of building a character the player then chooses one or more livings.  The character spends a number of years training in each living and is normally assumed to have fully completed all training at the start of the campaign.

Age impacts the maximum values that each attribute may have.  An inexperienced character may thus have low initial values but great potential while an older character with experience may actually find that their attributes are limited by their age maximum, and continue to decline as they get older.  A character starting with many livings will be older than other characters and will thus never achieve the lofty attribute scores a younger character could achieve.  Older characters are also more susceptible to disease.

Livings 

Professions (called Livings) in Maelstrom are not like the rigid class systems seen in many other RPGs from the 1980s. A character may have one, two, or more livings as long as the referee agrees (a player normally being expected to provide a plausible explanation for the character having studied so many areas, and having to spend a number of years training in each).  In some cases a character may be expected to refrain from using skills previously acquired on entering a new living. One example noted in the rule book is that of a mercenary becoming a priest and being expected to eschew previous experience with weapons.

Following is a partial list showing a range of the Livings a character may choose from, from both the core rulebook and the Maelstrom Companion. (Some livings are divided into sub-sets of a main category, this is denoted by parentheses.)

 Noble
 Professional (Clerk, Doctor, Architect, Scrivener, etc.)
 Priest / member of religious order / Pastor
 Craftsman (Armourer, Bladesmith, Tailor, Painter, Mason, Engraver, etc.)
 Trader (Butcher, Fishmonger, Vintner, Grocer, etc.)
 Mercenary
 Sailor
 Hunter
 Rogue (Beggar, Thief, Burglar, Assassin, Trickster, or no specialty)
 Mage
 Travelling player (Minstrel, Musician, Actor)
 Herbalist
 Barber-Surgeon
 Alchemist
 Servant
 Labourer

Magic system 
Mages in 16th and 17th century Europe are seen as practitioners of ancient magical arts. They are not witches although the authorities often regard as such. Mages must keep their identities hidden from the Church and secular authority, and so need to also have a respectable profession.

No list of spells is provided, a mage can attempt to cast any spell that is within the areas of magic understood by the character.  Mages can specialise, which provides improved capability in some areas or they may choose to study only certain areas and be unable to cast spells unrelated to their area of study.

When casting a spell Mages contact the "Maelstrom" to warp reality. The more that reality would need to change in order to fulfil the spell the more difficult the spell is to cast. Spells are graded by the referee on a scale of 1 to 5 with 5 (representing events that are impossible) being the most difficult.  Inexperienced mages will typically be only able to cast spells of grade 1 or 2 and even the most experienced mages will have difficulty with a spell of grade 5.  Failure to successfully cast a spell can be dangerous with the severity of the consequences growing with the grade of the spell.

With an optional rule in place, excessive use of magic, particularly in a single area, can cause instabilities in reality.

The Living of mage is rare as well as it is outlawed. In Maelstrom, a campaign success is possible without a single player or non-player character mage in the party. Several game sessions might take place between an appearance of a non-player character mage. The game rules allowed the option of playing the entire campaign without any supernatural element, if desired.

Reception
A review by Graeme Davis Imagine magazine described the game as "overall [...] an interesting and elegantly-designed game. Players of fantasy rpgs will find a host of immensely useful information on 'real' late-Medieval life and society which could be a great help in developing campaign backgrounds, especially for city adventures."

References

External links
 Publisher Page
 DriveThruRPG – PDF sales site with all Maelstrom-related game modules, supplements, and accessories shown
 Sample images of paper miniatures depicting characters of several livings
 An interview with Maelstrom author Alexander Scott

Fantasy role-playing games
Historical role-playing games
British role-playing games
Role-playing games introduced in 1984